In enzymology, a sphingosine beta-galactosyltransferase is an enzyme that catalyzes the chemical reaction

UDP-galactose + sphingosine  UDP + psychosine

Thus, the two substrates of this enzyme are UDP-galactose and sphingosine, whereas its two products are UDP and psychosine.

This enzyme belongs to the family of glycosyltransferases, specifically the hexosyltransferases.  The systematic name of this enzyme class is UDP-galactose:sphingosine 1-beta-galactosyltransferase. Other names in common use include psychosine-UDP galactosyltransferase, galactosyl-sphingosine transferase, psychosine-uridine diphosphate galactosyltransferase, UDP-galactose:sphingosine O-galactosyl transferase, uridine diphosphogalactose-sphingosine beta-galactosyltransferase, and UDP-galactose:sphingosine 1-beta-galactotransferase.  This enzyme participates in sphingolipid metabolism.

References 

EC 2.4.1
Enzymes of unknown structure